Cedar Springs is an unincorporated community in Preble County, in the U.S. state of Ohio.

History
Natural springs in the area were believed by Native Americans to hold medicinal qualities. Cedar Springs had its start in the 1870s when a hotel opened at the springs.

References

Unincorporated communities in Preble County, Ohio
Unincorporated communities in Ohio